Awaous stamineus, commonly known as ‘O‘opu nakea, is a species of goby native to the Hawaiian Islands. It has been previously considered a synonym of Awaous guamensis but recent work based upon morphological and genetic differences has recognized Hawaiian populations as being distinct. Consequently, Hawaiian Awaous are now recognized as a valid, distinct species.

Description and biology 
‘O‘opu nakea are omnivores. Analyses of their gut volume have shown to consist 84% of filamentous algae and the other 16% of chironomids (non-biting midges). ‘O‘opu nakea are about 14 inches long and have white streaks with speckles and a dark olive color. They lay eggs downstream where the males and females guard the nest. The males make the nest and attract the females who then lay one clutch a year.

Predators of this species include various birds, including the ‘auku‘u (black-crowned night heron), and other fishes, including āholehole (dark-margined flagtail), ulua (trevallies), moi (Pacific threadfin), and kākü (great barracuda).

Distribution and habitat 
‘O‘opu nakea are found in slow-moving waters especially on Kaua‘i during their annual spawning run to the stream mouth. ‘O‘opu nakea swim-up stream between 10 to 200 feet in strong currents.

Human use and cultural significance 
They are eaten raw or cooked. The usual way to prepare them is by salting them for 12 hours, then wrapping them in ti leaves and placing them over hot coals.

References 

stamineus
Freshwater fish of Hawaii
Endemic fauna of Hawaii
Taxonomy articles created by Polbot
Fish described in 1850
Taxobox binomials not recognized by IUCN